The Château Rocher (or Château fort de Blot-le-Rocher) is a French castle overlooking the Sioule river valley.  It is located in the commune of Saint-Rémy-de-Blot in the Puy-de-Dôme département of the Auvergne-Rhône-Alpes région.

The "romantic ruins of Château Rocher", standing on a cliff above the river, are the remains of a 13th-century construction, with evidence of earlier (11th century) building. The castle was built by the Lords of Bourbon. A masonry bridge crossing the moat leads to the entry door, now ruined, and the outer wall.  A second wall existed in front of the two eastern towers.  Three principal towers flanked the east and north fronts.

Privately owned, Château Rocher has been listed since 1913 as a monument historique by the French Ministry of Culture.

Gallery

See also
List of castles in France

References

External links
 

Ruined castles in Auvergne-Rhône-Alpes
Buildings and structures in Puy-de-Dôme
Monuments historiques of Puy-de-Dôme